Marillenschnaps, also called Marillenbrand, is a fruit brandy made from apricots. It is mostly produced in the Wachau region of Austria, but similar apricot brandies are produced elsewhere. Many small orchards produce excellent home-made varieties of Marillenschnaps.

Marillen is an Austrian German and Bavarian term for apricots, which are known as Aprikosen in other German-speaking regions.

Production
Marillenschnaps should be clear with a strong apricot aroma.

See also
         
Barack (brandy)
Schnapps

References 

Fruit brandies